Harry Lester Wilhelm  (April 7, 1874 – February 20, 1944) was a pitcher in Major League Baseball for the 1899 Louisville Colonels. He attended Westminster College.

He began his professional career with the Carlisle Colts and Chambersburg Maroons of the independent Cumberland Valley League in 1896.  His best season in the minors was in 1899 when he had a record of 21-10 in 32 games for the Lancaster Maroons of the Atlantic League.  While he was in the minors, he played a variety of positions.  In addition to pitching as he did in the major leagues, he also played shortstop, left field and right field.  His last season in the minor leagues was with the Albany Senators of the class B New York State League in 1903.

External links

1874 births
1944 deaths
Major League Baseball pitchers
Louisville Colonels players
19th-century baseball players
Baseball players from Pennsylvania
Carlisle Colts players
Chambersburg Maroons players
Lancaster Maroons players
Westminster Titans baseball players
Syracuse Stars (minor league baseball) players
Troy Washerwomen players
Columbus Senators players
Hartford Senators players
Albany Senators players